Michael Dennis Reilly (born February 14, 1959) is an American former professional football player who was a linebacker with the Los Angeles Rams in the National Football League (NFL). He played college football with the Oklahoma Sooners, and was drafted by the Rams in the eighth round of the 1982 NFL Draft. During training camp as a Rams rookie in 1982, Reilly was involved in a car accident that killed a 17-year old boy. He served a one-year jail sentence for drunken driving and felony vehicular manslaughter.

References

External links
 

1959 births
Living people
American football linebackers
Los Angeles Rams players
Oklahoma Sooners football players